Yaoshania pachychilus, the panda loach, is a species of gastromyzontid loach endemic to mountain streams in Jinxiu County, Guangxi in China. This species grows to a length of  SL.  This species is monotypic, but it was formerly included in Protomyzon. Juveniles are strikingly coloured in black-and-white, but adults are relatively plain. Y. pachychilus quickly became a popular aquarium fish in the 2010s.

References

Gastromyzontidae
Monotypic fish genera
Endemic fauna of Guangxi
Freshwater fish of China
Fish described in 1980